The Autodromo Vallelunga Piero Taruffi is a racing circuit situated  north of Rome, Italy, near Vallelunga of Campagnano. Vallelunga was built as a  sand oval in 1951.

 
From 1963 the circuit held the Rome Grand Prix, and in 1967 a new loop was added when the track became the property of the Automobile Club d'Italia (ACI). Further refurbishment was undertaken in 1971. The track is named for the famous Italian racing driver Piero Taruffi.

In August 2004 work started on a  extension to the track, bringing the track up to its current length. The new configuration has received homologation from the FIA as a test circuit, being used by various Formula One teams. The circuit has also hosted the 6 Hours of Vallelunga endurance event.

The track is also used by ACI for public driving safety training courses and, in autumn of each year, hosts a vast flea-market specialising mainly in vintage automotive spare parts.

The circuit is home to simulation software developers Kunos Simulazioni, who occupy a pit garage as an office.

Events

 Current

 June: TCR Italian Series, Porsche Carrera Cup Italy, CIV Superbike Championship
 July: FIA ETCR – eTouring Car World Cup, NASCAR Whelen Euro Series NASCAR GP Italy - American Festival of Rome
 October: 6 Hours of Vallelunga, GT4 European Series, Italian GT Championship, Italian F4 Championship
 November: Lamborghini Super Trofeo World Final (2013, 2018, 2023)

 Former

 BPR Global GT Series (1994)
 European Formula Two Championship Rome Grand Prix (1967–1969, 1971, 1973–1984)
 European Touring Car Championship (1974, 1976, 1979–1985, 1988, 2000)
 European Touring Car Cup (2005)
 Euroseries 3000 (1999–2002, 2005–2009)
 FIA European Formula 3 Championship (1976–1979, 1981, 1983)
 FIA Formula 3 European Championship (2013)
 FIA Motorsport Games (2019)
 FIM Endurance World Championship (2002–2005)
 Formula Regional European Championship (2019–2020)
 IMSA European Le Mans (2001)
 International Formula 3000 Rome Grand Prix (1985–1989, 1991)
 International GT Open (2007–2008)
 Superbike World Championship (2007–2008)
 Superleague Formula (2008)
 Superstars Series (2004–2013)
 World Sportscar Championship (1973, 1976–1980)
 World Touring Car Cup FIA WTCR Race of Italy (2022)

Lap records

The outright unofficial all-time track record for the current International Circuit layout is 1:12.804, set by Anthony Davidson in a Honda RA106, during Formula One testing in April 2006. The outright track record for the former International Circuit (now the Historic International Circuit) is 56.335 seconds, set by Luca Badoer in a Ferrari F2004, during Formula One testing in October 2004. The fastest official race lap records at the ACI Vallelunga Circuit are listed as:

References

External links 

 ACI Vallelunga Circuit In Italian only
 Satellite picture by Google Maps

Motorsport venues in Italy
Sports venues in Italy
Superbike World Championship circuits
World Touring Car Championship circuits
Sport in Lazio